David Horejš (born 19 May 1977) is a Czech football manager and former player. He was the club captain.

References

Honours

Managerial 
 SK Dynamo České Budějovice
Czech National Football League: 2018–19

External links
 Guardian Football

Czech footballers
1977 births
Living people
Czech First League players
SK Dynamo České Budějovice players
FC Zbrojovka Brno players
Association football defenders
People from Prachatice
Czech football managers
SK Dynamo České Budějovice managers
FK Jablonec managers
Sportspeople from the South Bohemian Region
Czech National Football League managers
Czech First League managers